Leucopsila is a genus of poriferans in the family Baeriidae. It contains one species, Leucopsila stylifera, which was originally described as Leuconia stylifera in 1870. The genus was described by Dendy & Row in 1913.

References

Calcaronea
Monotypic sponge genera
Taxa named by Arthur Dendy